The Nye House, also known as the Louis E. May Museum, is a historic building in Fremont, Nebraska. It was built in 1874 for Theron Nye, who lived here with his wife, née Caroline Colson, and their four children.

History 
Nye was a farmer and the founding president of the  First National Bank of Fremont. He designed the house in the Italianate style. His son, Ray Nye, served as the first mayor of Fremont. He hired Ferry & Clas to redesign the house in the Georgian Revival architectural style; the remodel was accomplished during 1901-12. From 1921 to 1968, it housed a Lutheran seminary known as the Western Theological Seminary. It was later turned into the Louis E. May Museum. It has been listed on the National Register of Historic Places since November 23, 1977.

References

External links
Louis E. May Museum

National Register of Historic Places in Dodge County, Nebraska
Georgian Revival architecture in Nebraska
Houses completed in 1874
Museums in Dodge County, Nebraska
History museums in Nebraska